Attila Czanka (born 1 May 1969) is a Romanian weightlifter. He competed in the men's featherweight event at the 1988 Summer Olympics. He also competed in the featherweight event at the 1992 Summer Olympics, representing Hungary.

Major results

References

External links
 
 
 

1969 births
Living people
Romanian male weightlifters
Hungarian male weightlifters
Olympic weightlifters of Romania
Olympic weightlifters of Hungary
Weightlifters at the 1988 Summer Olympics
Weightlifters at the 1992 Summer Olympics
Sportspeople from Cluj-Napoca
World Weightlifting Championships medalists
20th-century Romanian people